Pranshu Samdarshi is an Indian scholar of Buddhism. He is an assistant professor at Nalanda University, Rajgir, Bihar India. In April 2009, he was elected to a two-year term as national secretary for SPIC MACAY.

Early life and education 
Samdarshi was born in 1983 at Bagaha, a small town in West Champaran, Bihar, India. His father Dinesh Bhramar is a Hindi and Bhojpuri poet.
After taking a bachelor's degree in computer science and engineering from CUSAT, Samdarshi completed his master's degree and MPhil from the Department of Buddhist Studies, University of Delhi.

Career 
Prior to joining Nalanda University in 2021, Samdarshi has served as an assistant professor at International Centre for Spiritual Studies of Amrita University, Bengaluru campus (2019-2021).  In 2017, he was invited to teach and designed courses on Buddhist studies at Indira Gandhi National Centre for the Arts, Delhi, Namgyal Institute of Tibetology, Gangtok, Sikkim, India.

Books and research 
He has published several research papers, book chapters, and reviews for journals and magazines from publications such as Routledge, Cambridge University Press, The Hindu Group, and Delhi University Journal. He has been presenting papers on historiography of Buddhist tantra through conferences and talks. He has also done research works on Buddhism in Bihar with special focus on Champaran.

References

External links
 Dr. Pranshu Samdarshi
 Vidwan | Profile Page
 Pranshu Samdarshi at Academia.edu

Buddhist studies scholars
Living people
1983 births
People from Bihar
Delhi University alumni